World Trigger is a Japanese anime series based on the manga series of the same name written and illustrated by Daisuke Ashihara. During Jump Festa '20, it was announced that the series will receive a second season, with the cast reprising their roles. Toei Animation is returning to produce the anime. Morio Hatano is the new series director, while the rest of the staff are reprising their roles. The second season aired on TV Asahi's NUMAnimation block from January 10 to April 4, 2021.

On October 8, 2021, it was announced the English dub of season 2 will be released sometime in 2022.


On September 28th, 2022 Toei announced via Twitter that the dubs of seasons two and three would start streaming on October 4th.

Episode list

Notes

References

World Trigger
2021 Japanese television seasons